Tomáš Török (born 18 June 1995) is a Slovak professional ice hockey player who currently playing for HC Slovan Bratislava of the Slovak Extraliga.

Career statistics

Regular season and playoffs

References

External links
 

1995 births
Living people
Slovak ice hockey left wingers
HKM Zvolen players
Sherbrooke Phoenix players
Drummondville Voltigeurs players
Sioux City Musketeers players
MHC Martin players
HK Poprad players
HC Prešov players
HC Nové Zámky players
HC 07 Detva players
HC '05 Banská Bystrica players
HK Dukla Michalovce players
HC Slovan Bratislava players
Sportspeople from Martin, Slovakia
Slovak expatriate ice hockey players in the United States
Slovak expatriate ice hockey players in Canada
Slovak expatriate ice hockey players in the Czech Republic